Saint Symphorien or Saint-Symphorian may refer to:

Places

Belgium 
Saint-Symphorien, Belgium

France 
 Saint-Symphorien, Cher
 Saint-Symphorien, Deux-Sèvres
 Saint-Symphorien, Eure
 Saint-Symphorien, Gironde
 Saint-Symphorien, Lozère
 Saint-Symphorien, Sarthe
 Saint-Symphorien-d'Ancelles, in the Saône-et-Loire departement
 Saint-Symphorien-de-Lay, in the Loire departement
 Saint-Symphorien-de-Mahun, in the Ardèche departement
 Saint-Symphorien-de-Marmagne, in the Saône-et-Loire departement
 Saint-Symphorien-des-Bois, in the Saône-et-Loire departement
 Saint-Symphorien-des-Bruyères, in the Orne departement
 Saint-Symphorien-des-Monts, in the Manche departement
 Saint-Symphorien-de-Thénières, in the Aveyron departement
 Saint-Symphorien-d'Ozon, in the Rhône departement
 Saint-Symphorien-le-Château, in the Eure-et-Loir departement
 Saint-Symphorien-le-Valois, in the Manche departement
 Saint-Symphorien-sous-Chomérac, in the Ardèche departement
 Saint-Symphorien-sur-Coise, in the Rhône departement
 Saint-Symphorien-sur-Couze, in the Haute-Vienne departement
 Saint-Symphorien-sur-Saône, in the Côte-d'Or departement

Other uses 
 Saint Symphorian, a Christian saint
 Stade Saint-Symphorien, a stadium in Metz, France
 St Symphorien Military Cemetery near Mons, Belgium